Lunjiao is a sub-district in Shunde District, Foshan, Guangdong Province, China, which is in the east of Shunde and a part of the city zone.

References

External links
Official site of Lunjiao Government (Chinese Version)

Shunde District
Township-level divisions of Guangdong
Subdistricts of the People's Republic of China